The England cricket team toured New Zealand in February 2023 to play two Test matches. The Test matches were not part of the 2021–23 ICC World Test Championship. New Zealand Cricket (NZC) confirmed the fixtures for the tour in June 2022.

Squads

Ahead of the first Test, Kyle Jamieson was ruled out of the series due to the recurrence of the stress fracture while Matt Henry was unavailable for the first Test due to family reasons. Both of these players were replaced by Jacob Duffy and Scott Kuggeleijn in New Zealand's squad.

Tour match

Test series

1st Test

2nd Test

Notes

References

External links
 Series home at ESPN Cricinfo

2023 in English cricket
2023 in New Zealand cricket
International cricket competitions in 2022–23
2022-23